Mylothris basalis is a butterfly in the family Pieridae. It is found in Cameroon, Equatorial Guinea, Gabon, the central and north-eastern part of the Democratic Republic of the Congo and western Tanzania. The habitat consists of lowland forests.

References

Butterflies described in 1906
Pierini